Marko Đurišić (born 17 July 1997) is a Serbian football midfielder who plays for FK Voždovac.

Club career

Vojvodina
He made his Serbian SuperLiga debut for Vojvodina on 14 August 2016 in 4:0 home win against Javor.

Career statistics

Club

References

External links
 

1997 births
Living people
Association football midfielders
Serbian footballers
Serbian expatriate footballers
Footballers from Novi Sad
FK Vojvodina players
FK Proleter Novi Sad players
FK Mačva Šabac players
FK Dinamo Vranje players
Riga FC players
Serbian SuperLiga players
Serbian First League players
Latvian Higher League players
Serbian expatriate sportspeople in Latvia
Expatriate footballers in Latvia